Road Rules: X-Treme is the thirteenth season of the MTV reality television series Road Rules, which takes a group of young people and places them on a series of quests and challenges to compete for prizes. X-Treme took place in South America, in Argentina and Chile. It was the first and only Road Rules season to have a dog to be credited as part of the cast.

Cast

Original cast

Additional cast

Duration of cast 

 Table key
  = Cast Member is featured on this episode.
  = Cast Member replaces another cast member.
  = Cast Member is voted out of the show.
Notes

Missions

Episodes

After filming
Kina returned to the series as part of the alumni cast of Road Rules 2007: Viewers' Revenge.

Jodi lives in Germany with her husband and their son.

On June 7, 2017, Dias was found dead in his Brooklyn apartment at the age of 34, with a drug-related suicide being cited as the possible cause of his death.<ref>{{cite news |title=MTV 'Road Rules Daniel Dias dead at 34 |url=http://www.foxnews.com/entertainment/2017/06/07/mtv-road-rules-daniel-dias-dead-at-34.html |publisher=Fox News |date=June 7, 2017 |access-date=June 7, 2017}}</ref>

In July 2018, Trimbur was diagnosed with breast cancer.

In 2022, Kosinksi married Nicole Gruman. Kosinski also has a son with ex-wife Amy Manchin.

The Challenge

Challenge in bold indicates that the contestant was a finalist on The Challenge.

Note: Derrick made an appearance on Vendettas'' for an elimination.

References

External links

Official Road Rules: X-Treme Site

Road Rules
2004 American television seasons
Television shows filmed in Argentina
Television shows filmed in Chile